Roderick Julian Modell is an American electronic music producer, DJ and musician from Port Huron, Michigan, known professionally as Deepchord (pronunciation: [diːpkɔːrd]; sometimes stylized as DeepChord). 

Modell was born on July 22, 1969, in Detroit, Michigan. He worked with Mike Schommer to produce music under the Deepchord moniker as well as co-founded an eponymous record label in Detroit during the mid-1990s. However, currently the project name of Deepchord represents only Modell, who is using a number of aliases besides. The musical style of Deepchord is similar to both the minimal Berlin sound of artists like Basic Channel and the techno tradition of Detroit.

Modell might be best known for his collaboration with Stephen Hitchell (Soultek) as Echospace or cv313. In 2007, they released the album The Coldest Season on the record label Modern Love. Modell has also performed live with Hitchell as Echospace.

Modell has also collaborated with fellow Detroit native Mike Huckaby.

Selected discography
Albums/EPs
2003: Kettle Point EP as Rod Modell (Echocord)
2004: Illuminati Audio Science with Kevin Hanton (Silentes)
2007: The Coldest Season as Deepchord Presents Echospace
2007: Vantage Isle as Deepchord (echospace [detroit])
2007: Incense & Black Light  as Rod Modell (Plop)
2007: Plays Michael Mantra (Silentes)
2010: Liumin as Deepchord Presents Echospace
2011: Hash-Bar Loops as Deepchord (Soma)
2012: Silent World as Deepchord Presents Echospace (Echospace)
2012: Sommer as Deepchord (Soma)
2014: Yagya and Deepchord: Redesigns Remixes of ambient tracks by Yagya (Subwax)
2014: Lanterns (Astral Industries)
2015: Ultraviolet Music (Soma)
2017: Auratones (Soma)
2022: Functional Design (out 09.30.22) (Soma)

Singles
2001: "dc10" (Deepchord)
2001: "dc11" (Deepchord)
2001: "dc12" (Deepchord)
2001: "dc13" (Deepchord)
2001: "dc14" (Deepchord)
2003: "dc16" (Deepchord)
2008: "The Detroit Remixes" with Mike Huckaby (Cache Records)
2011: "Hash-Bar Remnants (Part 1)" (Soma)
2011: "Hash-Bar Remnants (Part 2)" (Soma)
2012: "The Tonality of Night" (Soma)
2013: "Prana/Tantra" (Soma)
2014: "Luxury" (Soma)
2018: "Immersions" (Astral Industries)

Remixes
2007: Convextion - "Miranda"
2007: Model 500 - "Starlight"
2008: Shocking Pinks - "Dressed to Please"
2016: Peter Michael Hamel - Colours of Time

References

External links

 Echospace at Bandcamp

1969 births
Living people
20th-century American musicians
21st-century American musicians
American techno musicians
Ambient musicians
Musicians from Detroit
People from Port Huron, Michigan